Commerce was launched at Bermuda in 1786. She initially sailed between London and North America, and later between London and the West Indies. In 1803 new owners dispatched her on a whaling voyage. She may have been lost in late 1806 as she was returning from her voyage; she was last listed in 1806.

Career
Commerce first appeared in Lloyd's Register (LR) in 1789 with P. Warren, master, A. Shaw, owner, and trade London–Charleston. Thereafter she traded with North America and as a West Indiaman.

Whaling voyage: On 20 June 1803 Captain Jacob Eckstein acquired a letter of marque. He then sailed Commerce for Patagonia. She was reported to have been well at the "Bay of St Fundy" around April 1804.

On 26 February 1805, Lloyd's List reported that although Commerce, of Liverpool, Eckstein, master, had been reported lost off Patagonia, Vigilant had left her "all well" there. Commerce, Echstein, was reported to have been at Patagonia on 4 October 1804 with 150 tons of oil.

However, a report a week later revealed that Commerce simply intended to proceed on another voyage.

On 22 October 1806 Commerce, Eckstein, master, was off Scilly, returning from the South Seas.

Fate
Lloyd's List reports a Commerce, Jenaway, master, arriving back at Liverpool on 29 October, from the South Seas. However, Lloyd's Register for 1806 carried the annotation "lost" by her name.

Lloyd's Register

Citations and references
Citations

References

1786 ships
Ships built in Bermuda
Age of Sail merchant ships of England
Whaling ships